Chananian is a most beautiful village in Leepa Valley, Hattian Bala District of Azad Kashmir, Pakistan.

The village is accessible from Reshian by Jeep. Few hotels with basic facilities are located here for tourists stay.

References

Populated places in Jhelum Valley District
Hill stations in Pakistan
2005 Kashmir earthquake
Tourist attractions in Azad Kashmir
Villages in Jhelum Valley District